Bunyip 20 was a day racing trimaran sailboat designed and built by Lock Crowther and his family in 1959, while he was still a teenager. It was named after the Bunyip, an Australian mythical creature.

In 1960 Crowther raced the first boat at the Easter regatta at Paynesville, Victoria, Australia, and won against a field of 300 boats. This initial success inspired others to build similar boats, and began his career.

See also
List of multihulls
Lock Crowther

References

Trimarans
Boats designed by Lock Crowther